Denise Joanne Reid (born 15 June 1967) is a South African former cricketer who played as a left-handed batter and right-arm fast-medium. She appeared in one Test match and 29 One Day Internationals for South Africa between 1997 and 2002. She played domestic cricket for Western Province and Boland.

References

External links
 
 

1967 births
Living people
People from Stellenbosch
South African women cricketers
South Africa women Test cricketers
South Africa women One Day International cricketers
Western Province women cricketers
Boland women cricketers
Cricketers from the Western Cape